The Golden Triangle is the name given to the affluent region outside of Faro, capital of the Algarve region of Portugal. Famous for its luxury resorts and Michelin star restaurants, it is located between three points:
 Resort-town of Vilamoura
 Town of Almancil
 Luxury resorts of Quinta do Lago and Vale do Lobo
Vilamoura is one of the most popular tourist destinations in Portugal, home to a yacht marina and numerous resorts. Almancil is home to three Michelin starred restaurants, while Vilamoura has one. Quinta do Lago and Vale do Lobo are luxury resorts that have both hosted the Portuguese Open, part of the PGA European Tour, in 1976, 1984–1986, 1988, 1989, 1990, and 2001–2003.

References

Resorts in Portugal
Algarve
Loulé